Nolee Ashilin binti Mohammed Radzi is a Malaysian politician. She is the Member of Perak State Legislative Assembly for Tualang Sekah from 2008 to 2022 and was a member of the Perak State Executive Councillor.

Political career

Being EXCO 
Nolee Ashilin is appointed by the former Menteri Besar Zambry Abdul Kadir as the Perak State Executive Councillor for Health, Tourism and Culture after the 2013 Malaysian general election.

Supporting PH 
On 13 May 2018, she gave support for Pakatan Harapan in order for them to form a government as the Perak State Legislative Assembly is a hung parliament despite being a Barisan Nasional state assemblyman. On 15 December 2020, Ahmad Faizal, the Menteri Besar at that time appointed her as a Perak State Executive Councillor.

Expelled from UMNO 
On 18 January 2019, she had clarified that her UMNO membership had been terminated, instead of quitting UMNO. She also denied about 'jumping' to other parties.

Joining BERSATU 
On 9 March 2020, Ahmad Faizal, the Deputy President of BERSATU and then-Menteri Besar, had announced that she had joined BERSATU.

Election results

Honours

Honours of Malaysia 
  :
  Medal of the Order of the Defender of the Realm (PPN) (2007)
  :
 Meritorious Service Medal (PJK)
  Knight of the Order of Cura Si Manja Kini (DPCM) – Dato' (2014)

References

Living people
People from Perak
Malaysian people of Malay descent
Malaysian Muslims
Former United Malays National Organisation politicians
Malaysian United Indigenous Party politicians
Members of the Perak State Legislative Assembly
Women MLAs in Perak
Perak state executive councillors
21st-century Malaysian politicians
Year of birth missing (living people)
21st-century Malaysian women politicians
Medallists of the Order of the Defender of the Realm